Frank M Tejeda Academy is a secondary alternative school located in San Antonio, Texas, in the Harlandale Independent School District. The school serves all of HISD, which is southern San Antonio near the Interstate 410. In 2015, the school was rated "Met Alternative Standard" by the Texas Education Agency.

Frank M Tejeda Academy is an alternative school and does not have school team sports; however, it does offer physical education, also known as PE.

References

External links
Official Website

Schools in Bexar County, Texas
Public high schools in Texas
Alternative schools in the United States